An arch bridge is a bridge with abutments at each end shaped as a curved arch. Arch bridges work by transferring the weight of the bridge and its loads partially into a horizontal thrust restrained by the abutments at either side. A viaduct (a long bridge) may be made from a series of arches, although other more economical structures are typically used today.

History 

Possibly the oldest existing arch bridge is the Mycenaean Arkadiko Bridge in Greece from about 1300 BC. The stone corbel arch bridge is still used by the local populace. The well-preserved Hellenistic Eleutherna Bridge has a triangular corbel arch. The 4th century BC Rhodes Footbridge rests on an early voussoir arch.

Although true arches were already known by the Etruscans and ancient Greeks, the Romans were – as with the vault and the dome – the first to fully realize the potential of arches for bridge construction. A list of Roman bridges compiled by the engineer Colin O'Connor features 330 Roman stone bridges for traffic, 34 Roman timber bridges and 54 Roman aqueduct bridges, a substantial part still standing and even used to carry vehicles. A more complete survey by the Italian scholar Vittorio Galliazzo found 931 Roman bridges, mostly of stone, in as many as 26 countries (including former Yugoslavia).

Roman arch bridges were usually semicircular, although a number were segmental arch bridges (such as Alconétar Bridge), a bridge which has a curved arch that is less than a semicircle. The advantages of the segmental arch bridge were that it allowed great amounts of flood water to pass under it, which would prevent the bridge from being swept away during floods and the bridge itself could be more lightweight. Generally, Roman bridges featured wedge-shaped primary arch stones (voussoirs) of the same in size and shape. The Romans built both single spans and lengthy multiple arch aqueducts, such as the Pont du Gard and Segovia Aqueduct. Their bridges featured from an early time onwards flood openings in the piers, e.g. in the Pons Fabricius in Rome (62 BC), one of the world's oldest major bridges still standing.

Roman engineers were the first and until the industrial revolution the only ones to construct bridges with concrete, which they called Opus caementicium. The outside was usually covered with brick or ashlar, as in the Alcántara bridge.

The Romans also introduced segmental arch bridges into bridge construction. The  Limyra Bridge in southwestern Turkey features 26 segmental arches with an average span-to-rise ratio of 5.3:1, giving the bridge an unusually flat profile unsurpassed for more than a millennium. Trajan's bridge over the Danube featured open-spandrel segmental arches made of wood (standing on  concrete piers). The late Roman Karamagara Bridge in Cappadocia may represent the earliest surviving bridge featuring a pointed arch.

In medieval Europe, bridge builders improved on the Roman structures by using narrower piers, thinner arch barrels and higher span-to-rise ratios on bridges. Gothic pointed arches were also introduced, reducing lateral thrust, and spans increased as with the eccentric Puente del Diablo (1282).

The 14th century in particular saw bridge building reaching new heights.

Constructions such as the acclaimed Florentine segmental arch bridge Ponte Vecchio (1345) combined sound engineering (span-to-rise ratio of over 5.3 to 1) with aesthetical appeal. The three elegant arches of the Renaissance Ponte Santa Trinita (1569) constitute the oldest elliptic arch bridge worldwide. Such low rising structures required massive abutments, which at the Venetian Rialto bridge and the Fleischbrücke in Nuremberg (span-to-rise ratio 6.4:1) were founded on thousands of wooden piles, partly rammed obliquely into the grounds to counteract more effectively the lateral thrust.

In China, the oldest existing arch bridge is the Zhaozhou Bridge of 605 AD, which combined a very low span-to-rise ratio of 5.2:1, with the use of spandrel arches (buttressed with iron brackets). Bridges with perforated spandrels can be found worldwide, such as in China (Zhaozhou Bridge, 7th century). Greece (Bridge of Arta, 17th century) and Wales (Cenarth Bridge, 18th century).

In more modern times, stone and brick arches continued to be built by many civil engineers, including Thomas Telford, Isambard Kingdom Brunel and John Rennie. A key pioneer was Jean-Rodolphe Perronet, who used much narrower piers, revised calculation methods and exceptionally low span-to-rise ratios. Different materials, such as cast iron, steel and concrete have been increasingly used in the construction of arch bridges.

Simple compression arch bridges

Advantages of simple materials 

Stone, brick and other such materials are strong in compression and somewhat so in shear, but cannot resist much force in tension. As a result, masonry arch bridges are designed to be constantly under compression, so far as is possible. Each arch is constructed over a temporary falsework frame, known as a centring. In the first compression arch bridges, a keystone in the middle of the bridge bore the weight of the rest of the bridge. The more weight that was put onto the bridge, the stronger its structure became. Masonry arch bridges use a quantity of fill material (typically compacted rubble) above the arch in order to increase this dead-weight on the bridge and prevent tension from occurring in the arch ring as loads move across the bridge. Other materials that were used to build this type of bridge were brick and unreinforced concrete. When masonry (cut stone) is used the angles of the faces are cut to minimize shear forces. Where random masonry (uncut and unprepared stones) is used they are mortared together and the mortar is allowed to set before the falsework is removed.

Traditional masonry arches are generally durable, and somewhat resistant to settlement or undermining. However, relative to modern alternatives, such bridges are very heavy, requiring extensive foundations. They are also expensive to build wherever labor costs are high.

Construction sequence

 Where the arches are founded in a watercourse bed (on piers or banks) the water is diverted so the gravel can first be excavated and replaced with a good footing (of strong material). From these, the foundation piers are erected/raised to the height of the intended base of the arches, a point known as the springing.
 Falsework centering (in British English: arch frame) is fabricated, typically from timbers and boards. Since each arch of a multi-arch bridge will impose a thrust upon its neighbors, it is necessary either that all arches of the bridge be raised at the same time, or that very wide piers be used. The thrust from the end arches is taken into the earth by substantial (vertical) footings at the canyon walls, or by large inclined planes forming in a sense ramps to the bridge, which may also be formed of arches.
 The several arches are (or single arch is) constructed over the centering.  Once each basic arch barrel is constructed, the arches are (or arch is) stabilized with infill masonry above, which may be laid in horizontal running bond courses (layers). These may form two outer walls, known as the spandrels, which are then infilled with appropriate loose material and rubble.
 The road is paved and parapet walls protectively confine traffic to the bridge.

Types of arch bridge

Corbel arch bridge 

The corbel arch bridge is a masonry, or stone, bridge where each successively higher course (layer) cantilevers slightly more than the previous course. The steps of the masonry may be trimmed to make the arch have a rounded shape. The corbel arch does not produce thrust, or outward pressure at the bottom of the arch, and is not considered a true arch. It is more stable than a true arch because it does not have this thrust. The disadvantage is that this type of arch is not suitable for large spans.

Aqueducts and canal viaducts 

In some locations it is necessary to span a wide gap at a relatively high elevation, such as when a canal or water supply must span a valley. Rather than building extremely large arches, or very tall supporting columns (difficult using stone), a series of arched structures are built one atop another, with wider structures at the base. Roman civil engineers developed the design and constructed highly refined structures using only simple materials, equipment, and mathematics. This type is still used in canal viaducts and roadways as it has a pleasing shape, particularly when spanning water, as the reflections of the arches form a visual impression of circles or ellipses.

Deck arch bridge 

This type of bridge comprises an arch where the deck is completely above the arch. The area between the arch and the deck is known as the spandrel. If the spandrel is solid, usually the case in a masonry or stone arch bridge, the bridge is called a closed-spandrel deck arch bridge. If the deck is supported by a number of vertical columns rising from the arch, the bridge is known as an open-spandrel deck arch bridge. The Alexander Hamilton Bridge is an example of an open-spandrel arch bridge. Finally, if the arch supports the deck only at the top of the arch, the bridge is called a cathedral arch bridge.

Through arch bridge 

This type of bridge has an arch whose base is at or below the deck, but whose top rises above it, so the deck passes through the arch.  The central part of the deck is supported by the arch via suspension cables or tie bars, as with a tied-arch bridge.  The ends of the bridge may be supported from below, as with a deck arch bridge.  Any part supported from arch below may have spandrels that are closed or open.

The Sydney Harbour Bridge and the Bayonne Bridge are a through arch bridge which uses a truss type arch.

Tied-arch bridge 

Also known as a bowstring arch, this type of arch bridge incorporates a tie between two opposite ends of the arch. The tie is usually the deck and is capable of withstanding the horizontal thrust forces which would normally be exerted on the abutments of an arch bridge.

The deck is suspended from the arch.  The arch is in compression, in contrast to a suspension bridge where the catenary is in tension.  A tied-arch bridge can also be a through arch bridge.

Hinged arch bridge 

An arch bridge with hinges incorporated to allow movement between structural elements.  A single-hinged bridge has a hinge at the crown of the arch, a two-hinged bridge has hinges at both springing points and a three-hinged bridge has hinged in all three locations.

Gallery

Use of modern materials 
Most modern arch bridges are made from reinforced concrete. This type of bridge is suitable where a temporary centring may be erected to support the forms, reinforcing steel, and uncured concrete. When the concrete is sufficiently set the forms and falseworks are then removed. It is also possible to construct a reinforced concrete arch from precast concrete, where the arch is built in two halves which are then leaned against each other.

Many modern bridges, made of steel or reinforced concrete, often bear some of their load by tension within their structure. This reduces or eliminates the horizontal thrust against the abutments and allows their construction on weaker ground. Structurally and analytically they are not true arches but rather a beam with the shape of an arch. See truss arch bridge for more on this type.

A modern evolution of the arch bridge is the long-span through arch bridge. This has been made possible by the use of light materials that are strong in tension such as steel and prestressed concrete.

See also 

 Deck (bridge)
 List of arch bridges by length
 List of longest masonry arch bridge spans
 Natural arch
 Parabolic arch
 Roman bridge
 Skew arch
 Through arch bridge
 Tied arch bridge
 Truss arch bridge

Footnotes

References

External links 

 NOVA Online - Super Bridge - Arch Bridges
 Matsuo Bridge Co. - Arch Bridges
 Historic Bridges of the Midwest
 Historic Arch Railroad Bridges in Western Massachusetts

 
Bridges by structural type